The War of the Burgundian Succession took place from 1477 to 1482 (or 1493 according to some historians), immediately following the Burgundian Wars. At stake was the partition of the Burgundian hereditary lands between the Kingdom of France and the House of Habsburg, after Duke Charles the Bold had perished in the Battle of Nancy on 5 January 1477.

Inheritance of Charles the Bold 
Charles the Bold had no male successor. Mary of Burgundy was the only child of the deceased duke, and many lords desired her hand in marriage to acquire the Burgundian inheritance. Amongst them was Charles, son of King Louis XI of France, who was formally the Burgundian duke's overlord. Louis sought to exploit the opportunity of Duke Charles' death, which triggered unrest and uprisings (such as the Guelderian War of Independence, 1477–1499) in the Burgundian lands, and sent his armies to occupy several territories, including the Duchy of Burgundy itself and the Free County of Burgundy (Franche-Comté), Picardy, and the County of Artois. By having Mary married to his son and heir presumptive, he could secure all Burgundian hereditary lands. However, the heiress was put under pressure by the States General to not deliver the provinces to France. To rally foreign support and calm the unrest at home, Mary granted the Great Privilege to the States General on 11 February.

Besides the French candidate, there was also the captive Guelderian duke, Adolf of Egmont, who was released by Flemish rebels in Ghent on the condition that he would liberate Tournai from the French. This way, Mary's party could strike two blows in one move: achieve peace between Burgundy and rebelling Guelders, and forge an alliance between both powers against France. The Siege of Tournai (1477), however, was a failure, which complicated the reconquest of Artois and Picardy. Moreover, Adolf was killed in action (27 June), which eliminated the Guelderian candidate, and prompted the States of Guelders to ally themselves with France instead, continuing their uprising against Burgundy.

Mary's eye was then captured by the Habsburg archduke of Austria, Maximilian I. He possessed the means necessary to repel the French armies, and the Habsburg dynastic forecasts were favourable. On 19 August 1477 the wedding took place, thereby joining the houses of Burgundy and Habsburg together.

War of succession 
Archduke Maximilian then undertook intense efforts to retain as many of the Burgundian hereditary provinces, in which he had to fight off both France in the south and Guelders in the north, and simultaneously repress internal revolts, mainly in Flanders. The perseverance of the heartland of the Burgundian empire turned out to be impossible: the States of Burgundy had already acknowledged the French annexation on 29 January.

Maximilian first turned to diplomacy, reminding French king Louis of the 1475 Peace of Soleuvre in order to retrieve all French-occupied Burgundian territories. He even managed to get his father Frederick III, Holy Roman Emperor to threaten France with an Imperial war because of the occupation of Cambrésis. Louis XI relented, agreed to a ceasefire and returned some border cities including the Imperial City of Cambrai in the autumn of 1477. However, the Duchy of Burgundy and the Free County of Burgundy – the Burgundian heartland – remained in French hands for the time being. In the winter of 1477–8, Maximilian failed to procure the aid of his father Frederick III (who was at war with Hungarian king Matthias Corvinus) and of his cousin Sigismund of Tyrol (who had financial problems and depended on a French pension, so remained neutral).

In 1478, the provinces of Auxois, Charolais, and Beaune rebelled and tried to secede from the king, but they had to surrender again in 1479. Louis XI then attempted an invasion of Artois. On 7 August 1479, the French troops were defeated by an army of Flemish and Habsburg forces in the Battle of Guinegate. Thereafter, Maximilian was occupied with the Netherlands, where he fared better in combatting the Guelderians.

Peace 
Eventually, France and the Habsburgs signed the Treaty of Arras (1482). Maximilian recognised the annexation of the two Burgundies and several other territories. France retained most of its Burgundian fiefdoms except for the affluent County of Flanders, which passed to Maximilian (but soon rebelled against the archduke). With the 1493 Treaty of Senlis, Maximilian would regain the County of Burgundy, Arras and Charolais, but the Burgundian heartland and Picardy were lost definitively to France.

See also 
 Burgundian Wars
 Great Privilege
 Treaty of Arras (1482)

References 

1470s in the Burgundian Netherlands
1480s in the Burgundian Netherlands
History of Burgundy
Wars involving France
1470s in France
1480s in France
1480s in the Holy Roman Empire
Burgundy